Navchetan School, officially Shri Damubhai Shukla Educational Campus is a school in Ahmedabad, Gujarat, India that was founded in 1935 by Damubhai Shukla. It is operated by non-profit Navchetan Trust and affiliated with the Gujarat Secondary and Higher Secondary Education Board, along with Sikkim Manipal University for Business Administration program. It provides both Gujarati as well as English medium education facilities. It also provides higher secondary school education in commerce as well as science streams.

History 
Damubhai Shukla founded the educational institution in 1935. Earlier the campus of the institute was based near at Ashirwad Complex, Paldi but now it is at Paldi Road with own premises of three-floor building with ground area and sports area along with canteen facilities.

Educational Facilities 
Navchetan High School provides education for primary, secondary and higher secondary level.

The institution affiliated with Sikkim Manipal University for Business Administration studies.

Notable alumni
 Prabodh Pandit

References

Schools in Ahmedabad